Governor Edwards may refer to:

Edward I. Edwards (1863–1931), 37th governor of New Jersey
Edwin Edwards (1927–2021), 50th governor of Louisiana
Henry W. Edwards (1779–1847), 27th governor of Connecticut
James B. Edwards (1927–2014), 110th governor of South Carolina
John Bel Edwards (born 1966), 56th governor of Louisiana
John Cummins Edwards (1804–1888), 9th governor of Missouri
Ninian Edwards (1775–1833), 3rd governor of Illinois
Richard Edwards (Royal Navy officer, died 1773), governor of Newfoundland in 1746
Richard Edwards (Royal Navy officer, died 1795), governor of Newfoundland from 1757 to 1759 and from 1779 to 1781